The Pančevo Panthers are an American football club from Pančevo, Serbia, founded in 2003.

External links
 https://web.archive.org/web/20090205193130/http://panthers.rs/
 http://www.saaf.rs/

American football teams in Serbia
2003 establishments in Serbia
American football teams established in 2003